Jackson Memorial Hospital (also known as "Jackson" or abbreviated "MJMH") is a non-profit, tertiary care hospital, the primary teaching hospital of the University of Miami's School of Medicine, and the largest hospital in the United States with 1,547 beds.

The hospital is located in Miami's Health District at 1611 NW 12th Avenue at the Northwest quadrant of Interstate 95 and the Dolphin East-West Expressway, two of metropolitan Miami's most heavily trafficked highways. The hospital is accessible by Miami Metrorail's rapid transit system at the Civic Center Station stop at 1501 Northwest 12th Avenue in Miami.

Jackson Memorial Hospital is the center of a thriving medical campus in Miami's Health District that includes Miami's Veterans Administration Medical Center, the University of Miami Hospital (formerly Cedars of Lebanon Medical Center), and the University of Miami's Leonard M. Miller School of Medicine with its vast research affiliates, laboratories, and institutes, including the University of Miami Sylvester Comprehensive Cancer Center, the University of Miami's Bascom Palmer Eye Institute (the nation's top-rated ophthalmology hospital), the Anne Bates Leach Eye Hospital, the Diabetes Research Foundation, the National Parkinson's Foundation, and the University of Miami's Project to Cure Paralysis.  

Jackson Memorial Hospital's Miami Transplant Institute is the largest transplant center in the U.S., performing more transplants in 2019 than any US center has ever performed in a single year. It is the only hospital in Florida to perform every kind of organ transplant for both adult and pediatric patients,

It is among the world's largest hospitals, currently the third largest public hospital and third largest teaching hospital in the United States. With more than 1,550 beds, it is a referral center, a magnet for research and home to the Ryder Trauma Center, the only Level 1 Adult and Pediatric trauma center in Miami-Dade County, the most populous county in Florida and the seventh most populous county in the nation. 

Jackson Memorial is the centerpiece of the Jackson Health System, owned and operated by Miami-Dade County through the Public Health Trust. The hospital is supported by Miami-Dade County residents through a half-cent sales tax. In fiscal 2014 the Public Health Trust received $364 million in unrestricted funds from Miami-Dade County. In 2013 Miami-Dade voters approved a separate $830 million bond program for major upgrades to the facility.

Rankings and awards
In 2015 Jackson Memorial Hospital received one star out of a possible best of five stars according to the Medicare.Gov Hospital Compare survey. In 2007, four University of Miami specialties Jackson Memorial Hospital were ranked among the best in the country by U.S. News & World Report. The University of Miami Bascom Palmer Eye Institute was ranked as the best Ophthalmologic center in the U.S. Jackson Memorial's Ear, Nose and Throat was ranked 17th, while the digestive disorders and kidney disease programs were ranked 32nd. JMH is home to Holtz Children's Hospital, which has 254 licensed beds and cares for children—newborn to 21 years old—with everything from common ailments to multi-organ transplants. Holtz was ranked among the top hospitals in treating child kidney disorders.

Denial of partner access

In 2007, Jackson denied a lesbian, Janice Langbehn, access to her partner of 17 years as she was dying of an aneurysm. Langbehn also claimed that Jackson refused to take medical information about her partner from Langbehn, and ignored a power of attorney sent via fax to the hospital's trauma center.

A lawsuit was filed against the hospital as a result. Jackson stated that, "it has no obligation to allow their patients' visitors nor any obligation whatsoever to their patients’ families, healthcare surrogates, and visitors." The presiding judge, Adalberto Jordan, dismissed the case, stating that Langbehn had no relief under Florida law. Jordan found that Langbehn had not been "denied the right to make any medical decision on behalf of" her partner.

Two days after Jackson's announcement, in part as a result of Langbehn's story, President Barack Obama issued a memorandum ordering hospitals receiving Medicare and Medicaid funding to allow patients to decide who can visit them and prohibit discrimination, including sexual orientation and gender identity.

Other notability
 Kazi Mobin-Uddin, MD (Inventor of first inferior vena cava filter) trained at Jackson Memorial.
 Jackson Memorial was the site of the death of Arthur Macduffie after his beating at the hands of Dade County Public Safety Department officers following a motorcycle chase in December 1979. The eventual acquittal of officers involved in the beating in May 1980 sparked the Miami race riots, which filled Jackson with hundreds of trauma patients.
While Bob Marley was flying home from Germany to Jamaica, his vital functions rapidly deteriorated due to already existing cancer. After landing in Miami, Florida, he was taken to the hospital for immediate medical attention. Marley died on 11 May 1981 at Cedars of Lebanon Hospital in Miami (now University of Miami Hospital) at the age of 36. The spread of melanoma to his lungs and brain caused his death. His final words to his son Ziggy were "Money can't buy life."
On February 8, 1997, professional motorcycle stunt rider Corey Scott was pronounced dead at Jackson Memorial Hospital, after his motorcycle stunt went horribly wrong at the Orange Bowl stadium. The fatal accident was witnessed by a crowd of thousands and was all captured on camera.
On July 15, 1997, fashion icon Gianni Versace was declared dead at Jackson Memorial Hospital, following a shooting in front of his Ocean Drive mansion, the Casa Casuarina, in Miami Beach.
The owner of two Subway franchises located inside Jackson Memorial Hospital came up with selling foot-long subs for a lower price at his two stores on the weekends in 2004, to help spur business. It eventually led to the Subway $5 footlong promotion, which was launched nationally in 2008 and became Subway's most successful promotion ever, influencing other businesses.
On November 27, 2007, former University of Miami and Washington Redskins (Now Washington commanders) football star Sean Taylor was declared dead at Jackson Memorial Hospital, following a shooting of Taylor in his Miami-area home.
On 29 May 2011 the singer Sean Kingston was taken to the Jackson Memorial Hospital after being involved in a Jet Ski accident with a female passenger. He was discharged on the 24th of June.
On June 7, 2012, 16-year-old Yasser Lopez made national news when he successfully underwent a delicate 3-hour neurosurgical operation to remove a spear that a speargun had fired into his skull when it was accidentally discharged during a fishing trip; 3 feet of the spear protruded from the wound above his eye socket, and that part had to be specially cut off so he could get a brain CT scan. Miraculously, no major blood vessels were harmed and the only impairments thus far are amnesia for the period during and around the event, which is somewhat normal, and some sluggishness in a hand.
 The hospital appeared in fictional form in the Jeffrey Archer short story, "Where There's a Will" published in And Thereby Hangs a Tale (2010).
 On July 7, 2021, Martine Moïse, the former first lady of Haiti, was treated at the Ryder Trauma Center at Jackson Memorial Hospital, following the assassination of the president.

References

External links
Official website

Hospital buildings completed in 1918
Teaching hospitals in Florida
Hospitals in Florida
Buildings and structures in Miami
University of Miami
1918 establishments in Florida
Hospitals established in 1918
Trauma centers
Public hospitals in the United States